Lloyd Dangle (born May 13, 1961) is an American writer and cartoonist, illustrator, and political satirist.

Biography

Early life and career

Lloyd Dangle graduated from Ann Arbor Huron High School in 1979, and attended the University of Michigan School of Art, graduating with a BFA in 1983. He was editor and contributor to the U of M's Gargoyle humor magazine.

Dangle worked as a designer, paste-up artist, and cartoonist for the Michigan Voice, an alternative newspaper in Flint, Michigan, that was founded and edited by future filmmaker Michael Moore; he served as a sound recordist on Moore's first movie, Roger and Me.

After leaving Michigan in 1983 he moved to New York City and worked for magazines and newspapers including Elle, Manhattan, Inc., Nuclear Times, and the Village Voice as a production artist.

Advocacy projects

Dangle has contributed to AIDS education efforts, particularly for IV drug users, including art directing the handbook The Works, used in prisons and drug rehabilitation clinics. He created a billboard, TV, and print campaign around a superhero, Bleachman, whose duty was to teach IV drug users to clean their needles at a time when needle exchange programs were illegal in California.

Dangle has served as Northern California chapter president and as national president of the Graphic Artists Guild, having helped found the former. He also lobbied the United States Congress in favor of the unsuccessful Freelance Artists and Writers Self Protection Act, introduced by Michigan Senator John Conyers in 2002, which intended to extend collective bargaining rights to freelance artists and writers negotiating with large media companies.

Troubletown
Troubletown is a syndicated weekly comic strip by Dangle. Begun in 1988 at the San Francisco Bay Guardian, it went on to run in many alternative press weeklies including The Stranger, The Portland Mercury, and the Austin Chronicle. It also appears regularly in The Progressive magazine. Most strips involve political satire from a liberal perspective. Several book collections of Troubletown have been published. It is also featured in the anthology Attitude: The New Subversive Cartoonists.

Dangle said he planned to retire his Troubletown strip at the end of April 2011.

Books
 Dangle (four issues, comic book series published by Cat-Head Comics, and later by Drawn & Quarterly publications).
 Troubletown
 Next Stop: Troubletown, Published by Manic D Press,
 Real Recipes For Casual Cooks, by Lynn Gordon (illustrated), Published by Random House
 Axis of Trouble, Published by Troubletown Books
 Ten Minute Activist (illustrated), by The Mission Collective
 Troubletown Told You So, Comics that Could've Saved Us from This Mess, published by Troubletown Books

References

External links
 LloydDangle.com (official site)
 Lloyd Dangle's blog

Living people
1961 births
American cartoonists
American comics artists
American comics writers
Artists from Michigan
Alternative cartoonists
Underground cartoonists
University of Michigan alumni
Artists from Ann Arbor, Michigan